Love Does is a 2012 Christian non-fiction book by Bob Goff. The book was released on May 1, 2012 through Thomas Nelson and collects several essays about life stories and experiences.

Synopsis
The book contains several anecdotes that he then ties into Christianity and how it relates to Goff and others. In each passage Goff relates several life lessons and how he believes that they can help the reader.

Reception
RELEVANT gave the book a positive review, writing that it "is an easy, challenging and inspiring read. If you've been looking for a breath of fresh air in your spirituality, this is it."

References

External links

2012 non-fiction books
Thomas Nelson (publisher) books